Leonard Packham (15 September 1891 – 4 October 1958) was an Australian cricketer. He played one first-class match for Western Australia in 1921/22.

See also
 List of Western Australia first-class cricketers

References

External links
 

1891 births
1958 deaths
Australian cricketers
Western Australia cricketers
Cricketers from Adelaide